The M35 road is a metropolitan route in the City of Tshwane in Gauteng, South Africa. It connects Pretoria North with a rural area north of  Soshanguve.

Route 
The M35 route begins at a junction with the R566 Route just north of the Pretoria North suburb. It begins by heading north-north-west for 14 kilometres, flying over the N4 Highway (Platinum Highway) and bypassing the Onderstepoort Private Nature Reserve to the east, to reach a junction with the M39 route. The M39 joins the M35 and they are one road northwards for 2 kilometres before the M39 becomes its own road westwards towards Soshanguve Central.

The M35 continues northwards for 9 kilometres, through the eastern parts of Soshanguve, to reach a junction with the M21 route. The M35 continues northwards, bypassing Soutpan (Tswaing), to exit the City of Tshwane Metropolitan Municipality and reach the village of Moeka in the North West Province, marking its end.

References 

Metropolitan Routes in Pretoria